Deborah L. Tolman is a developmental psychologist and the co-founder of SPARK: Sexualization Protest: Action, Resistance, Knowledge. She is the author of Dilemmas of Desire: Teenage Girls Talk about Sexuality, which was awarded the 2003 Distinguished Book Award from the Association for Women in Psychology.

Career 
Tolman received her Ed.D from Harvard University in 1992. She is also the former director of the Center for Research on Gender and Sexuality, and professor of human sexuality studies at San Francisco State University. Before relocating to San Francisco, she was "the senior research scientist and director of the Gender and Sexuality Project, and then an associate director of the Center for Research on Women, both at Wellesley College."

Tolman is currently a professor of social welfare and psychology at the Hunter College School of Social Work and the Graduate Center of CUNY.

Her research on adolescent sexuality, gender development, gender equity and research methods has been funded by grants from the National Institute of Child Health and Human Development, the Department of Health and Human Services, the Ford Foundation, and the Spencer Foundation.

In October 2010, Tolman co-founded SPARK (Sexualization Protest: Action, Resistance, Knowledge), an intergenerational "girl-fueled" movement building organization (with Lyn Mikel Brown) dedicated to challenging the sexualization of girls by engaging girls to be activists and working with partner organizations around the country. SPARK links academia to activism and demonstrates an alternative to the divisive "wave metaphor" regarding feminism.

Writing 
In 2003 Tolman's book on adolescent girls' sexuality, Dilemmas of Desire: Teenage Girls Talk about Sexuality, was awarded the 2003 Distinguished Book Award from the Association for Women in Psychology. Tolman has written 60+ articles and book chapters on adolescent girls' and boys' sexuality and  research methods. Tolman's work and commentary on adolescent sexuality and challenging sexualization has appeared in The New York Times, The Huffington Post, and multiple radio, television and online venues, including New York City's Joan Hamburg radio show and Brian Lehrer Show.

Personal life 
Deborah Tolman is married to Luis Ubiñas. They reside in New York City and have two sons.

Sources

External links 
 ASAP Initiative
 SPARKsummit

Living people
Harvard Graduate School of Education alumni
Developmental psychologists
San Francisco State University faculty
Hunter College faculty
Year of birth missing (living people)